The Murphy Rebel is a two- or three-seat, strut braced, high wing, taildragger monoplane which is sold in kit form by Murphy Aircraft in Chilliwack, British Columbia, Canada.

Development

The Rebel is a STOL aircraft and was designed to be a personal-use bush plane. It can operate from short, unimproved airstrips and can carry a useful load of up to 750 lbs.

The aircraft features a strut-braced high-wing, a two or three seat enclosed cabin accesses via doors, fixed conventional landing gear and a single engine in tractor configuration. The aircraft is made from sheet aluminum.

Specifications (Rebel)

Similar aircraft
 Aviat Husky
 American Champion Citabria and Scout
 Bede BD-4
 Capella XS
 Fisher Dakota Hawk
 Murphy Elite
 Murphy Maverick
 Piper Cub
 ULBI Wild Thing

References

External links

 

1990s Canadian civil utility aircraft
Homebuilt aircraft
High-wing aircraft
Single-engined tractor aircraft
Aircraft first flown in 1990
Rebel